The Air Force Falcons men's basketball statistical leaders are individual statistical leaders of the Air Force Falcons men's basketball program in various categories, including points, rebounds, assists, steals, and blocks. Within those areas, the lists identify single-game, single-season, and career leaders. The Falcons represent the United States Air Force Academy in the NCAA's Mountain West Conference.

Air Force began competing in intercollegiate basketball in 1956.  The NCAA did not officially record assists as a stat until the 1983–84 season, and blocks and steals until the 1985–86 season, but Air Force's record books includes players in these stats before these seasons. These lists are updated through the end of the 2021–22 season.

Scoring

Rebounds

Assists

Steals

Blocks

References

Lists of college basketball statistical leaders by team
Statistical